Kamieniec  is a village in Grodzisk Wielkopolski County, Greater Poland Voivodeship, in west-central Poland. It is the seat of the gmina (administrative district) called Gmina Kamieniec.

The village has a population of 1,098.

References

Villages in Grodzisk Wielkopolski County